A Final Hit is an album by the English electronic duo Leftfield, featuring all of their single releases, songs which were released on film soundtracks and others.  A Limited Edition release contained a bonus DVD with music videos to seven of the singles released by the band themselves.

Track listing

 The track "Phat Planet" was featured on the Guinness' 1999 advert Surfer.

Bonus DVD

References

2005 greatest hits albums
Leftfield albums